"Butterfly" is a song by Swedish bubblegum dance group Smile.dk, from their 1998 album, Smile. It was written and produced by Robert Uhlmann and Robin Rex.

The song gained popularity outside of Sweden when it was included on the first version of Konami's music video game, Dance Dance Revolution and Dance Dance Revolution 3rdMix. In honor of its popularity, the song was remixed for the franchise's 2008 installment Dance Dance Revolution X, a mix primarily intended to celebrate the 10-year anniversary of the series. The song also became an internet meme in the 2010s after being included in made-in-China toys, typically toy cell phones.

In 2009, the song was re-recorded with Veronica and Malin doing the vocals. This version was released as a single on May 13, 2009, and was titled "Butterfly '09 (United Forces Airplay Edit)."

South African band Die Antwoord sampled the song in their hit "Enter the Ninja," having heard it on Dance Dance Revolution X.

Music video
The music video begins as the two band members Veronica Almqvist and Cecilia Reiskog descend from a spaceship shaped like an orange butterfly onto a flat meadow with mountains in the distance. Immediately the two begin forging ahead through the meadow in order to find their dream-men, two samurais. 
First the two girls run into two little boys around eight years old, and since they are too young the band continues their journey. At this point the band manages to convert the path they have already traversed into a 3-D tunnel. 
At one point they run into another pair of boys, and these are nerdy-looking teens around fifteen years old. Again, the girls leave the boys standing. They finally encounter their dream-men at the end of this tunnel on a platform away from the entrance, and they briefly cross a chasm to get to them. The moment they are united, the butterfly-shaped spacecraft appears in a hole in the roof and they all ascend it; the ship flying away into the blue sky.

Film
The song was played twice during the 2019 film Flatland. It was briefly featured in the sixth episode of the Marvel Cinematic Universe Disney+ series WandaVision, titled "All-New Halloween Spooktacular!"

Official remixes
 Anaconda Remix — 4:21
 China Power Mix — 1:48
 Delaction Radio Remix — 3:40
 Delaction Mix — 5:48
 Extended Mix — 4:21
 Hyper-K Mix — 3:23
 KCP Kung-Fu Mix — 1:34
 Pan-Ace Radio Mix — 3:00
 Romance Mix — 2:56
 S3RL Mix — 4:50
 United Forces Airplay Edit — 3:07
 Upswing Mix — 5:25

References

1998 songs
 1998 singles
Smile.dk songs
Songs about insects
Songs written by Robert Uhlmann (composer)
EMI Records singles
Internet memes introduced in the 2010s